Wea or Wêa is a town in the Arta Region of Djibouti. Wea is the second largest city in the Arta Region after Arta and before Damerjog. It is the primary transportation hub in western Djibouti via highway. The town is situated in a small valley.

History
Wea's place-name literally means "turn" in the Afro-Asiatic Somali language. It later formed a part of the French Somaliland protectorate in the first half of the 20th century.

Overview
Wea lies on the RN-1 National Highway.

Nearby towns and villages include Djibouti City, Arta and Holhol. Public buses go from Djibouti City to Wea, taking about half an hour to get to the town. The ride itself costs around 350 Djiboutian franc. Arta is situated just up the mountain around 3 kilometres (2 miles) to the north.

Additionally, Wea serves as a commercial transit point for goods from Ethiopia. Ethiopian trucks and traders frequently pass through the town.

Geography
The hills form a valley, which constitutes an extension of a wadi. The outskirts of the town have served as a local agricultural center.

Climate
Wea has a hot arid climate (BWh) by the Köppen-Geiger system. The weather is sweltering during summer and very warm during winter.

Demographics
, the population of Wea has been estimated to be 4,667. The town inhabitants belong to various mainly Afro-Asiatic-speaking ethnic groups, with the Issa Somali predominant.

Sister towns

Notes

References
Wê‘a

External links
 Geographic Names

Arta Region
Populated places in Djibouti